Jan M. Maciejowski FIEEE is a British electrical engineer. He is Professor Emeritus of Control Engineering at the University of Cambridge. He is notable for his contributions to system identification and control.

Career
Maciejowski studied at the University of Sussex (BSc 1971) and the University of Cambridge (PhD 1978). As an academic, he joined the University of Cambridge where he became Professor of Control Engineering and a fellow of Pembroke College. From 2009 to 2014, Maciejowski was head of the Information Engineering Division within the University of Cambridge's Department of Engineering. From 2008 to 2018, he was President of Pembroke College.

Maciejowski's research has dealt with various aspects of control engineering, notably fault-tolerant control, autonomous systems, model predictive control and system identification. When awarding him a fellowship, the IEEE cited Maciejowski's "contributions to system identification and control".

He has played an active role in the activities of several learned societies, and was president of the European Control Association from 2003 to 2005.

He retired in 2018.

Awards
 Fellowship of the IEEE, awarded in 2011.

See also
 Control reconfiguration
 Autonomous robot
 Model predictive control
 System identification

JoJO References

Further reading
 

Members of the University of Cambridge Department of Engineering
Alumni of the University of Cambridge
Alumni of the University of Sussex
British electrical engineers
Control theorists
Fellow Members of the IEEE
Fellows of Pembroke College, Cambridge
Living people
Year of birth missing (living people)